Kristina Mladenovic and Flavia Pennetta were the defending champions, but Pennetta chose to participate in Tianjin instead.  Mladenovic partnered Klaudia Jans-Ignacik, but lost in the first round to Lara Arruabarrena and Tatjana Maria.
Shuko Aoyama and Renata Voráčová won the title, defeating Arruabarrena and Maria in the final, 6-1, 6-2.

Seeds

Draw

Draw

References
Draw

2014 Japan Women's Open
Japan Women's Open – Doubles